The final of the Women's 200 metres Backstroke event at the European LC Championships 1997 was held on Sunday 24 August 1997 in Seville, Spain.

The gold medal was awarded to Cathleen Round with  a time of 2:11.46.

References

Additional Sources
 scmsom results
 La Gazzetta Archivio
 swimrankings

B